Jhohan Sebastián Romaña Espitia (born 13 September 1998) is a Colombian professional footballer who plays as a defender for Major League Soccer club Austin FC.

Club career
Born in Apartadó, Romaña began his career with Categoría Primera A club Independiente Medellín. He made his professional debut for the club on 24 April 2016 against Águilas Doradas, coming on as a 68th minute substitute in a 2–0 victory. In 2019, Romaña joined Paraguayan Primera División club Guaraní. His debut for the club came on 1 December 2019 against Sol de América, starting in the 1–0 defeat.

Austin FC
On 22 December 2020, Romaña joined American Major League Soccer club Austin FC ahead of their inaugural season in 2021. He made his debut for Austin FC on 17 April 2021 in their inaugural match against Los Angeles FC, starting in the 2–0 away defeat.

Career statistics

References

External links
 Profile at Austin FC

1998 births
Living people
Colombian footballers
Colombian expatriate footballers
Expatriate soccer players in the United States
Association football defenders
Independiente Medellín footballers
Club Guaraní players
Austin FC players
Categoría Primera A players
Paraguayan Primera División players
Colombian expatriate sportspeople in the United States
Major League Soccer players
People from Apartadó
Sportspeople from Antioquia Department